The Victorian Railways J class was a class of  main line passenger locomotives manufactured by Beyer, Peacock & Company, Manchester, England for the Victorian Railways.

History
Originally numbered 2-6 under the first system of consecutive numbering system which duplicated numbers in each type (passenger / goods) locomotives. 

Not long after, the VR changed to the odd/even system, odd for goods, even for passenger. Thes locomotives were renumbered 2-10 (even only). Classed 'J' in 1886.

Fleet summary

References

Specific

External links
J class steam locomotive no. 10, Spencer Street

2-2-2 locomotives
2-4-0 locomotives
J class 1859
Railway locomotives introduced in 1859
Broad gauge locomotives in Australia
Scrapped locomotives
Beyer, Peacock locomotives